The Lithuanian Catholic Federation "Ateitis" (literally: future) is a youth organization in Lithuania uniting Catholic-minded schoolchildren, university students, and alumni. Ateitis is a member of the umbrella of Catholic youth organizations Fimcap.  Members of the Ateitis Federation are known as ateitininkai.

Name and aims
The aim of Ateitis is the integral development of young people enabling them to be effective apostles of Christ and creative agents capable of changing society according to Christian values. For historical reasons another central aim is to preserve the national heritage and culture of Lithuania. The five principles of Ateitis are: Catholicism, community spirit, social responsibility, education and patriotism. The motto of Ateitis is To Renew All Things in Christ.

History
Ateitis was founded on Feb. 19, 1910 as a secret student organization in Kaunas, Lithuania, then part of the Russian Empire. It gained its name from Ateitis magazine. After Lithuania gained its independence in 1918 and during the period between the two World Wars, the organization grew significantly and gained social and cultural influence in the Lithuanian society. Several famous Lithuanian writers, philosophers, historians, and politicians were members of the organization.

In the 1930s the authoritarian nationalist regime of President Antanas Smetona made it illegal to join Ateitis during the high school in order to slow down the growth of the organization, as many members of Ateitis later on had become leaders of the oppositional Christian Democratic Party.

During the occupation of Lithuania by the Soviet Union between 1945 and 1990, no Catholic organizations were allowed in Lithuania. The organization, however, continued to function in exile outside of Lithuania; for example, in North America.  
To this day, the Ateitis Foundation maintains a center in Lemont, Illinois.

After Lithuania regained its independence in 1990, Ateitis could return to Lithuania as an official youth organization. Due to the lengthy occupation, preserving the Lithuanian national heritage and culture has become a central element of the work and identity of Ateitis.

Ateitis is member of the international umbrella of Catholic youth organizations Fimcap since the General Assembly in Ghana in 2001. The first contact between Fimcap and Ateitis took place in Kehl, Germany, in 1999 during the Eurocontact seminar of Fimcap. After that, contacts between Fimcap and Ateitis became more frequent, ties grew stronger and this finally resulted in Ateitis being a full member of Fimcap.

Notable members
 Vaclovas Aliulis (1921-2015): priest
 Kazys Bobelis (1923–2013): Lithuanian surgeon and politician, member of the Seimas
 Vytautas Bogušis (born 1959): dissident and politician, member of the Seimas
 Bernardas Brazdžionis (1907–2002): poet
 Pranas Dovydaitis (1886–1942): university professor and politician, Prime Minister of Lithuania
 Vytautas Dudėnas (born 1937): investment banker and politician
 Gintaras Linas Grušas (born 1961): Archbishop of Vilnius
 Vladas Jurgutis (1885–1966): cleric and politician, professor, Foreign Minister of Lithuania, member of the Seimas, first chairman of the Bank of Lithuania
 Jonas Kauneckas (born 1938): Bishop of Panevėžys
 Salomėja Nėris (1904–1945): poet
 Feliksas Palubinskas (born 1935): politician, member of the Seimas, vice-president of the Seimas
 Arūnas Poniškaitis (born 1966): auxiliary bishop of Vilnius
 Aleksandras Stulginskis (1885–1969): President of Lithuania
 Sigitas Tamkevičius SJ (born 1938): Archbishop of Kaunas
 Egidijus Vareikis (born 1958): chemist, political scientist, and politician
 Arvydas Petras Žygas (1958–2011): priest, professor of anthropology at the Vytautas Magnus University in Kaunas

References

Catholic youth organizations
Youth organizations based in Lithuania
Youth organizations established in 1910
1910 establishments in Lithuania
Organizations based in Kaunas
Fimcap
Catholicism in Lithuania
Clubs and societies in Lithuania